Reimann's snake-necked turtle (Chelodina reimanni) is a species of turtle in the family Chelidae. The species is endemic to Oceania and Southeast Asia.

Geographic range
C. reimanni is found primarily in Merauke Regency and Yos Sudarso Island of Indonesia, and possibly also in adjacent areas of Papua New Guinea.

Description
Pictures of C. reimanni consistently denote a smiling face.

Habitat 
These turtles are native to western Irian to southwestern Papua New Guinea. They mainly live in marshy freshwater swamp like habitats. They eat mollusks, crayfish and insects. They have also been found to easily breed in captivity when they have warmth, water, protein rich foods, and a nesting area.

Conservation 
Reimann's Snake-necked Turtle has been added it to The World Conservation Union's red list of near threatened species.

Etymology
The specific name, reimanni, is in honor of herpetologist Michael J. Reimann.

References

External links

 Asian Turtle Trade Working Group (2000).  Chelodina reimanni.   2006 IUCN Red List of Threatened Species.   Downloaded on 29 July 2007.

Chelodina
Reptiles described in 1990
Taxonomy articles created by Polbot
Turtles of New Guinea
Endemic fauna of New Guinea